Silence is the fifth album by metal band Slapshock, released in 2006. The album introduced a metalcore sound, which was continued on subsequent releases.

Track listing 
All songs written by Jamir Garcia, Music By Slapshock

Personnel 
Richard Evora – drums
Vladimir Garcia – vocals
Lee Nadela - bass
Leandro Ansing - guitar
Jerry Basco - guitar

Album Credits 
Cassie Jayne Legaspi - Woman in the cover photo
Francis Reyes – producer
Angee Rozul – engineer

References 

Slapshock albums
2006 albums